Heavy metal fashion is the style of dress, body modification, make-up, hairstyle, and so on, taken on by fans of heavy metal, or, as they are often called, metalheads or headbangers. While the style has changed from the 1970s to the 2020s, certain key elements have remained constant, such as black clothes, long hair and leather jackets. In the 1980s, some bands began wearing spandex. Other attire includes denim or leather vests or jackets with band patches and logos, t-shirts with band names, and spiked wristbands.

Origins
The clothing associated with heavy metal has its roots in the biker, rocker, and leather subcultures. Heavy metal fashion includes elements such as leather jackets; combat boots, studded belts, hi-top basketball shoes (more common with old school thrash metalheads); blue or black  jeans, camouflage pants and shorts, and denim jackets or kutte vests, often adorned with badges, pins and patches. As with the bikers, there is a fascination with Germanic and German imagery, such as the Iron Cross.

Distinct aspects of heavy metal fashion can be credited to various bands, but the band that takes the most credit for revolutionizing the look was Judas Priest, primarily with its singer, Rob Halford. Halford wore a leather costume on stage as early as 1978 to coincide with the promotion for the Killing Machine (Hell Bent for Leather in the USA) album. In a 1998 interview, Halford described the leather subculture as the inspiration for this look. Halford may have been the one to popularize leather but K.K. Downing wanted a look that suited the music they were creating. Downing started wearing studded leather outfits on stage. Soon, the rest of the band followed. An example of this can be seen from live concert recordings from 1978. Downing is the only one on stage appearing with black studded leather jacket.

It was not long before other bands appropriated the leather look; Iron Maiden's original singer Paul Di'Anno began wearing leather jackets and studded bracelets, Motörhead innovated with bullet belts, and Saxon introduced spandex. This fashion was particularly popular with followers of the New wave of British heavy metal (NWOBHM) movement in the early 1980s, and sparked a revival for metal in this era.

The studded leather look was extended in subsequent variations, to the wearing of combat boots, studded belts and bracelets, bullet belts, spiked gauntlets, etc. The codpiece, however, appears to have been less popular among the general public.

Other influences
The style and clothing of metal has absorbed elements from influences as diverse as the musical influences from which the genre has borrowed. It is from this linking of different sub-styles of clothing and music influences that one can sometimes determine a person's specific taste in music simply from overall appearance. However, such signs are not hard and fast rulings in the majority of cases. This uncertainty is what makes the first key aspect of the metalheads' identity below so important.

Some of the influences of modern military clothing and the Vietnam War can be seen by the fans and bands of thrash metal, with the members of thrash metal bands of the 1980s like Metallica, Destruction, and Megadeth wearing bullet belts around their waists on stage. (It is likely that the thrash metal bands got the idea of wearing bullet belts from NWOBHM bands such as Motörhead, who have incorporated the bullet belt as part of their aesthetic since their inception, since many thrash metal bands in the 1980s were influenced by Motörhead.) This style is often connected to punk-metal and anti-fashion, as akin to the hardcore punk scene, as the formentioned style reflects similar attitudes. German Heavy Metal band Accept ex lead singer Udo Dirkschneider also contributed to the military clothing by wearing military pants from 1982, being considered as the first Heavy Metal musician to wear them.

Fans of glam metal often have long or very long, teased hair, and are dressed in spandex pants and/or leather jackets. They also may use (though not necessarily) some makeup (lipsticks, eye-shadows, tonal creams, etc.). Bands who play in glam metal genre may have instruments with extravagant colour(s) and attributes, like guitars with pink, violet, dalmatian or pink rose colour(s); microphone stands with (often) a leopard or silk scarf (there may be some different attributes attached to the microphone stand, but mostly only leopard-colour scarfs have been seen); drumsets with some artwork (this kind of drum set is seen in other metal genres as well, not only in glam metal).

The imagery and values of historic Celtic, Saxon, Viking and Chivalric culture is reflected heavily in metal music, by bands such as Blind Guardian, and has its impact upon the everyday fashion and especially the stagegear of metal artists.  The independence, masculinity and honor of the warrior ethos is extremely popular amongst metalheads, as is the rejection of perceived modern-day consumerist and metrosexual culture.  Folk metal, Viking metal, black metal and power metal fans often grow long thick hair and beards reminiscent of a stereotypical Viking, Saxon or Celt, and wear Thor's Hammer pendants and other pagan symbols.  On stage, in photoshoots, and in music videos, it is very common for bands of these genres such as Turisas and Moonsorrow to wear chain mail, animals skins, warpaint (such as woad) and other Dark Ages themed battle gear.

Corpse paint is another style of black-and-white makeup, used mainly by black metal bands to insinuate ones appearance as dead or not from this world. It is often composed of a white layer covering a person's face with black details on top, often in the shape of crosses or around the eyes. Bands such as Cradle of Filth and Kiss have stated that this has been born as a homage to early silent black-and-white horror movies. Black metal fans also sport goatees, all black outfits, leather jackets (sometimes with black and white band patches sewed on), spikes, jewelry, facial piercings and boots.

Power metal fans and musicians such as Rhapsody of Fire often wear attire reminiscent of the Renaissance and the Middle Ages including tight black or brown leather trousers and wide sleeved, buttonless shirts of various colors.  The imagery of bards and minstrels as well as knights is a popular part of power metal fashion.

Some stoner metal bands and fans have incorporated "retro" looks- boot-cut or bell-bottom jeans, headbands, and tie-dye or other colorful shirts inspired by 1960s and 1970s psychedelic rock as well as cannabis culture.

Nu metal fashion includes baggy pants or cargo shorts (borrowing from hip hop culture), spiked hair or dreadlocks, and an abundance of accessories.

Also notable is that the dark business suit now relates to some metal bands, most often doom, gothic or stoner acts. Bands such as Akercocke (although the band is death metal), The Vision Bleak, Lacrimosa, Motionless In White, Fleshgod Apocalypse (although band is death metal), Northern Kings (although the band is symphonic metal) are known for use of formal clothing in music videos and stage performances, sometimes followed by fans.

References

 
1980s fashion
1990s fashion
2000s fashion
2010s fashion
Youth culture in the United Kingdom